Taxability may refer to the eligibility of a person or entity for taxation:
 Taxable estate (Russian Empire)
 Taxable REIT subsidiaries

It may also refer to the base upon which a tax system imposes a tax:
 Taxable income 
 Taxable wages
 Taxable profit
 Taxable estate under an estate tax regime
 Taxable real-estate under a property tax regime
 Taxable goods and services under a sales tax regime
 Taxable transactions under a transfer tax regime

Tax terms